This is a list of 123 species in the genus Cladochaeta, spittlebug flies.

Cladochaeta species

 Cladochaeta abarista Grimaldi & Nguyen, 1999 c g
 Cladochaeta abbrevifusca Grimaldi & Nguyen, 1999 c g
 Cladochaeta abeja Grimaldi & Nguyen, 1999 c g
 Cladochaeta abrupta Grimaldi & Nguyen, 1999 c g
 Cladochaeta adumbrata (Duda, 1925) c g
 Cladochaeta adusta Grimaldi & Nguyen, 1999 c g
 Cladochaeta akantha Grimaldi & Nguyen, 1999 c g
 Cladochaeta albifrons Grimaldi & Nguyen, 1999 c g
 Cladochaeta ambidextra Grimaldi & Nguyen, 1999 c g
 Cladochaeta amblyharpa Grimaldi & Nguyen, 1999 c g
 Cladochaeta antalba Grimaldi & Nguyen, 1999 c g
 Cladochaeta aquila Grimaldi & Nguyen, 1999 c g
 Cladochaeta armata (Frota-Pessoa, 1947) c g
 Cladochaeta armatopsis  g
 Cladochaeta arthrostyla Grimaldi & Nguyen, 1999 c g
 Cladochaeta austrinversa Grimaldi & Nguyen, 1999 c g
 Cladochaeta bilinea Grimaldi & Nguyen, 1999 c g
 Cladochaeta bispina Grimaldi & Nguyen, 1999 c g
 Cladochaeta bomplandi (Malloch, 1934) c g
 Cladochaeta brunnea Grimaldi & Nguyen, 1999 c g
 Cladochaeta bupeo Grimaldi & Nguyen, 1999 c g
 Cladochaeta calvovis Grimaldi & Nguyen, 1999 c g
 Cladochaeta carinata Grimaldi & Nguyen, 1999 c g
 Cladochaeta centetor Grimaldi & Nguyen, 1999 c g
 Cladochaeta chaeta Grimaldi & Nguyen, 1999 c g
 Cladochaeta chelifera Grimaldi & Nguyen, 1999 c g
 Cladochaeta crassa Grimaldi & Nguyen, 1999 c g
 Cladochaeta dejecta Grimaldi & Nguyen, 1999 c g
 Cladochaeta devriesi Grimaldi & Nguyen, 1999 c g
 Cladochaeta dikra Grimaldi & Nguyen, 1999 c g
 Cladochaeta diminuta Grimaldi & Nguyen, 1999 c g
 Cladochaeta dolichofrons Grimaldi & Nguyen, 1999 c g
 Cladochaeta dominicana Grimaldi & Nguyen, 1999 c g
 Cladochaeta dominitica Grimaldi & Nguyen, 1999 c g
 Cladochaeta dracula Grimaldi & Nguyen, 1999 c g
 Cladochaeta ectopia Grimaldi & Nguyen, 1999 c g
 Cladochaeta erecta Grimaldi & Nguyen, 1999 c g
 Cladochaeta fasciata Grimaldi & Nguyen, 1999 c g
 Cladochaeta floridana (Malloch, 1924) i c g
 Cladochaeta florinversa Grimaldi & Nguyen, 1999 c g
 Cladochaeta fuscora Grimaldi & Nguyen, 1999 c g
 Cladochaeta genuinus Grimaldi & Nguyen, 1999 c g
 Cladochaeta glans Grimaldi & Nguyen, 1999 c g
 Cladochaeta glapica Grimaldi & Nguyen, 1999 c g
 Cladochaeta hadrunca Grimaldi & Nguyen, 1999 c g
 Cladochaeta hamula Grimaldi & Nguyen, 1999 c g
 Cladochaeta heedi Grimaldi & Nguyen, 1999 c g
 Cladochaeta hermani Grimaldi & Nguyen, 1999 c g
 Cladochaeta hodita Grimaldi & Nguyen, 1999 c g
 Cladochaeta howdeni Grimaldi & Nguyen, 1999 c g
 Cladochaeta incessa Grimaldi & Nguyen, 1999 c g
 Cladochaeta infumata (Duda, 1925) c g
 Cladochaeta inornata Grimaldi & Nguyen, 1999 c g
 Cladochaeta inversa (Walker, 1861) i c g b
 Cladochaeta jamaicensis Grimaldi & Nguyen, 1999 c g
 Cladochaeta janzeni Grimaldi & Nguyen, 1999 c g
 Cladochaeta johnsonae Nguyen, 2001 c g
 Cladochaeta labidia Grimaldi & Nguyen, 1999 c g
 Cladochaeta laevacerca Grimaldi & Nguyen, 1999 c g
 Cladochaeta longistyla Grimaldi & Nguyen, 1999 c g
 Cladochaeta masneri Grimaldi & Nguyen, 1999 c g
 Cladochaeta mathisi Grimaldi & Nguyen, 1999 c g
 Cladochaeta mexinversa Grimaldi & Nguyen, 1999 c g
 Cladochaeta minuta (Duda, 1925) c
 Cladochaeta mystaca Grimaldi & Nguyen, 1999 c g
 Cladochaeta neblina Grimaldi & Nguyen, 1999 c g
 Cladochaeta nebulosa Coquillett, 1900 i c g
 Cladochaeta neoinversa Grimaldi & Nguyen, 1999 c g
 Cladochaeta neosimplex Grimaldi & Nguyen, 1999 c g
 Cladochaeta nigranus Grimaldi & Nguyen, 1999 c g
 Cladochaeta obscura Grimaldi & Nguyen, 1999 c g
 Cladochaeta obunca Grimaldi & Nguyen, 1999 c g
 Cladochaeta onyx Grimaldi & Nguyen, 1999 c g
 Cladochaeta ostia Grimaldi & Nguyen, 1999 c g
 Cladochaeta paradoxa (Lamb, 1918) c g
 Cladochaeta paravolsella Grimaldi & Nguyen, 1999 c g
 Cladochaeta paulhansoni Grimaldi & Nguyen, 1999 c g
 Cladochaeta pequenita Grimaldi & Nguyen, 1999 c g
 Cladochaeta pleurvitta Grimaldi & Nguyen, 1999 c g
 Cladochaeta polia Grimaldi & Nguyen, 1999 c g
 Cladochaeta propenicula Grimaldi & Nguyen, 1999 c g
 Cladochaeta pruinopleura Grimaldi & Nguyen, 1999 c g
 Cladochaeta pseudikra Grimaldi & Nguyen, 1999 c g
 Cladochaeta pseudunca Grimaldi & Nguyen, 1999 c g
 Cladochaeta psychotria Grimaldi & Nguyen, 1999 c g
 Cladochaeta ptyelophila Tsacas, 1993 c g
 Cladochaeta ranhyae Grimaldi & Nguyen, 1999 c g
 Cladochaeta reversa Grimaldi & Nguyen, 1999 c g
 Cladochaeta robusta Grimaldi & Nguyen, 1999 c g
 Cladochaeta santana Grimaldi & Nguyen, 1999 c g
 Cladochaeta sclerstyla Grimaldi & Nguyen, 1999 c g
 Cladochaeta sepia Grimaldi & Nguyen, 1999 c g
 Cladochaeta similex Grimaldi & Nguyen, 1999 c g
 Cladochaeta simplex Grimaldi & Nguyen, 1999 c g
 Cladochaeta sororia (Williston, 1896) c g
 Cladochaeta spectabilis Grimaldi & Nguyen, 1999 c g
 Cladochaeta spinacosta Grimaldi & Nguyen, 1999 c g
 Cladochaeta spinula Grimaldi & Nguyen, 1999 c g
 Cladochaeta spira Grimaldi & Nguyen, 1999 c g
 Cladochaeta starki Grimaldi & Nguyen, 1999 c g
 Cladochaeta sternospina Grimaldi & Nguyen, 1999 c g
 Cladochaeta sturtevanti Wheeler & Takada, 1971 i c g b
 Cladochaeta telescopica Grimaldi & Nguyen, 1999 c g
 Cladochaeta tepui Grimaldi & Nguyen, 1999 c g
 Cladochaeta tica Grimaldi & Nguyen, 1999 c g
 Cladochaeta trauma Grimaldi & Nguyen, 1999 c g
 Cladochaeta travassosi (Frota-Pessoa, 1947) c g
 Cladochaeta tricerabops Grimaldi & Nguyen, 1999 c g
 Cladochaeta tripunctata Grimaldi & Nguyen, 1999 c g
 Cladochaeta tubula Grimaldi & Nguyen, 1999 c g
 Cladochaeta unca Grimaldi & Nguyen, 1999 c g
 Cladochaeta vapida Grimaldi & Nguyen, 1999 c g
 Cladochaeta venebula Grimaldi & Nguyen, 1999 c g
 Cladochaeta verdifrons Grimaldi & Nguyen, 1999 c g
 Cladochaeta vermes Grimaldi & Nguyen, 1999 c g
 Cladochaeta vittata Grimaldi & Nguyen, 1999 c g
 Cladochaeta vivipara Grimaldi & Nguyen, 1999 c g
 Cladochaeta volsella Grimaldi & Nguyen, 1999 c g
 Cladochaeta vomica Grimaldi & Nguyen, 1999 c g
 Cladochaeta wilhansoni Grimaldi & Nguyen, 1999 c g
 Cladochaeta wirthi Grimaldi & Nguyen, 1999 c g
 Cladochaeta yanomama Grimaldi & Nguyen, 1999 c g
 Cladochaeta zurquia Grimaldi & Nguyen, 1999 c g

Data sources: i = ITIS, c = Catalogue of Life, g = GBIF, b = Bugguide.net

References

Cladochaeta
Articles created by Qbugbot